Neocorynura muiscae is a species of sweat bee of the genus Neocorynura in the subfamily of Halictinae of the family of Halictidae. It was first described by Allan H. Smith-Pardo and Victor H. Gonzalez in 2006.

Etymology and habitat 

Nesting 
The nesting structure of Neocorynura muiscae has an entrance of an earthen turret surrounded by an elliptical tumulus. The surfaces of the turrets are not polished but internally smooth. The exterior is rough. Main burrows are vertical in flat ground. Most of the nests have been discovered in the pasture.

See also 

List of flora and fauna named after the Muisca

References 

Halictidae
Endemic fauna of Colombia
Arthropods of Colombia
Altiplano Cundiboyacense
Muisca
Insects described in 2006